Houston High School is a public high school serving Houston, Texas County, Missouri. It is operated by the Houston R-I School District. The high school building is a registered historic site.

History
Houston High School was built in 1921, as a two-story, brick building on a raised basement.  It sits on a concrete foundation and has native stone architectural details. The property was listed on the National Register of Historic Places in 2009.

References

External links
Houston R-1 School District

School buildings on the National Register of Historic Places in Missouri
School buildings completed in 1921
Schools in Texas County, Missouri
National Register of Historic Places in Texas County, Missouri
Public high schools in Missouri
1921 establishments in Missouri